The 2012 Selangor FA Season was Selangor FA's 7th season playing soccer in the Malaysia Super League Since its inception in 2004.

Selangor FA began the season on 10 January 2012. They will also compete in two domestic cups; The FA Cup Malaysia and Malaysia Cup.

Malaysia Super League

League table

Results

Fixtures and Results of the Malaysia Super League 2012 season.

 1 The venue was changed from Kuala Lumpur FA original venue at Hang Jebat Stadium, Melaka to Selangor FA venue at Shah Alam at the request of Kuala Lumpur FA.

Malaysia FA Cup

Matches

Malaysia Cup

Group stage

Group D

Knockout stage

Bracket

Transfer In/Outs

Transfers (In)

Transfers (Out)

References

Selangor
Selangor FA